Henry Fan Hung Ling, SBS, JP (born 2 June 1948 in Shanghai, Republic of China with family roots in Ningbo, Zhejiang) was the managing director of CITIC Pacific and the vice-chairman of Cathay Pacific Airways. He is now the chairman of Hospital Authority. He was a non-official member of the Executive Council of Hong Kong from 2007 to 2009. He was previously a barrister practising out of Temple Chambers in Hong Kong. 

He is the elder brother of Fanny Law, a former Hong Kong Government official. He graduated from the University of Hong Kong and Peking University.

In September 2022, Fan lobbied for a "significant expansion" of traditional Chinese medicine used in Hong Kong's public healthcare. Days after, the Hospital Authority released a study claiming that traditional Chinese medicine could help long COVID symptoms; however, the study was not conducted in a scientific randomized controlled trial.

In November 2022, Fan tested positive for COVID.

In December 2022, Fan admitted that a scheme to hire overseas doctors was "very unsatisfactory," with only 9 of 65 applications given an offer.

References

External links
The Honourable Henry FAN Hung-ling, SBS, JP

1948 births
Living people
Alumni of the University of Hong Kong
Cathay Pacific
CITIC Group people
Members of the Executive Council of Hong Kong
Hong Kong businesspeople
Peking University alumni
Businesspeople from Shanghai
Chinese bankers
Politicians from Shanghai
Recipients of the Silver Bauhinia Star
Hospital Authority
Members of the Election Committee of Hong Kong, 2021–2026